Beryozovsky District is an administrative and municipal district (raion), one of the forty-three in Krasnoyarsk Krai, Russia. It is located in the south of the krai and borders with Sukhobuzimsky District in the north, Rybinsky District in the east, Uyarsky District in the southeast, Mansky District in the south, Balakhtinsky District in the southwest, and with Yemelyanovsky District and the territory of the krai city of Krasnoyarsk in the west. Its administrative center is the urban locality (an urban-type settlement) of Beryozovka. Population:  The population of Beryozovka accounts for 55.2% of the district's total population.

History
The district was founded on April 25, 1983.

Government
As of 2013, the Head of the district is Leonid P. Kilin.

Demographics
As of the 2002 Census, the ethnic composition of the population was as follows:
Russians: 89.0%
Ukrainians: 2.6%
Germans: 2.5%
Belarusians: 1.6%
Chuvash: 1.1%
Tatars: 1.0%
Mordvins: 0.5%

Economy
The economy of the district is mostly agricultural. Leading agricultural enterprises include OOO "Sibirskaya Guberniya", OAO "Barkhatovskaya poultry farm", agricultural cooperatives "Beryozovsky", "Zykovsky", and "Yesaulsky", GUP "Krasnoyarskoye", and OOO "Maganskoye".  Additionally, about two hundred farms operate in the district.

Major industrial enterprises include OAO "Beryozovsky maintenance plant", AO "Yermolayevskaya REB", OOO "Beryozovskaya furniture factory", OAO "Krasnoyarskpolimer-keramika", OOO "Zykovsky brick factory", OAO "Beton", OOO "Beryozovsky bakery plant", "Nils" factory, and others.

A developed network of railroad maintenance facilities exists in the district.

Natural resources include limestone, granite, gravel, sand, and rubble, all of which were extensively used during the construction of Krasnoyarsk Dam. OAO "Litoye" is the main developer of natural resources in the district.

A significant portion of the district population is employed in Krasnoyarsk. In turn, Krasnoyarsk residents use the district for their dachas.

References

Notes

Sources

Districts of Krasnoyarsk Krai
States and territories established in 1983